Stanley Jackson (born March 24, 1975) is a former American football quarterback who played in the Canadian Football League (CFL) and Continental Indoor Football League (CIFL). He was also the co-owner of the CIFL's Marion Mayhem.

College career
Jackson played college football for the Ohio State Buckeyes, where he alternated with Joe Germaine at the quarterback position. He was part of the 1996 team that won the 1997 Rose Bowl.

Professional career

Montreal Alouettes
In 1999 and 2000, Jackson played quarterback for the Montreal Alouettes in the CFL. In two seasons, Jackson completed 50 of 90 passes for 679 yards with one touchdown and three interceptions.

During his time as a football player, Stanley Jackson would periodically worK as a staff member at The Lords Ranch in Warm Springs, Arkansas.

Toronto Argonauts
In 2001 and 2002, Jackson had moved on to the Toronto Argonauts. He saw significantly less playing time, completing 14 of only 22 attempts for 2 touchdowns and 3 interceptions.

Winnipeg Blue Bombers
After sitting out all of 2003 with a knee injury, Winnipeg Blue Bombers gave Jackson a chance to play quarterback again in 2004. He completed only 4 passes on 12 attempts for 67 yards.

Marion Mayhem
After retiring for two years, Jackson played for the Marion Mayhem of the newly formed, Continental Indoor Football League. Citing that he missed the game after sitting out, Jackson tried out and made the Mayhem squad. He was also part owner in the low budget league. He went on to have 3 successful seasons with the Mayhem, guiding them to 6-6, 7-5, and 9-3 records. He owns two CIFL records, passing completions in a season (177) and passing attempts in a season (348).

Post retirement
Jackson is currently a color analyst for college football games on the Big Ten Network. He has also served as an analyst for the Ohio State Buckeyes' pre-game and post-game show on WTVN radio in Columbus, Ohio. He is married to Ronita "Myricks" Jackson, has 4 children and currently lives in Westerville, Ohio. Jackson has also been appointed by Ohio Governor John Kasich to the Ohio State Board of Education, an action which has created some controversy in Ohio among some educators who have voiced doubt that Jackson has the appropriate credentials for the position.
In February 2023 Jackson was named as the head football coach at Westerville North High School.

References

https://www.kait8.com/story/33499373/lords-ranch-owner-sentenced-in-bribery-scheme/?outputType=amp

https://arktimes.com/news/cover-stories/2009/08/06/its-not-childs-play

http://www.heal-online.org/trinitylordshome.htm

1975 births
African-American players of American football
African-American players of Canadian football
American football quarterbacks
Canadian football quarterbacks
College football announcers
Living people
Marion Mayhem players
Montreal Alouettes players
Ohio State Buckeyes football players
Paterson Catholic High School alumni
Players of American football from Ohio
Players of American football from Paterson, New Jersey
Toronto Argonauts players
21st-century African-American sportspeople
20th-century African-American sportspeople